Clare McDonnell (born 1967) is a Sony Radio Academy Awards winning British radio broadcaster and presenter.

Career 
McDonnell began as a reporter in local radio in England, and from there moved on to be a radio presenter.

For several years, she presented the Breakfast Show on BBC GLR Radio, and many shows on national radio, such as the Trade Update series on BBC Radio 1, and Global on BBC Radio Five Live, where she also worked on the Nicky Campbell Show as the Euro News presenter.

McDonnell was a television presenter on Liquid News, an entertainment news show on BBC One and BBC Three.

She was one of the original presenters at the launch of BBC Radio 6 Music in March 2002, starting with a Saturday afternoon show. She later presented the weekend overnight music show on Saturday and Sunday until her final broadcast on BBC Radio 6 Music on 28 March 2010.

In January 2010 she started co-presenting the breakfast show with John Warnett on BBC Radio Kent

, McDonnell is one of the main presenters for the 05:00–08:00 GMT edition of Newsday on the BBC World Service. She also regularly appears on BBC Radio 5 Live, co-presenting 5 Live Breakfast, Weekend Breakfast and as a relief presenter for other programmes.

References

External links 

5 Live Drive (BBC Radio 5 Live)

British radio personalities
British radio DJs
BBC Radio 1 presenters
BBC Radio 5 Live presenters
BBC Radio 6 Music presenters
BBC World Service people
1967 births
Living people